Events from the year 1490 in Ireland.

Incumbent
Lord: Henry VII

Events
 Thaddeus McCarthy appointed Bishop of Cork and Cloyne

References